Tadeusz Cymański (born 6 June 1955 in Nowy Staw) is a Polish conservative politician. He was elected to the Sejm on 25 September 2005 getting 23,518 votes in 25 Gdańsk district, as a candidate from the Law and Justice list.

He was also a member of Sejm 1997-2001 and Sejm 2001-2005.

In the 2015 elections he was re-elected to the Sejm, receiving 13,126 votes from the Law and Justice list in the Gdansk district

See also
Members of Polish Sejm 2005-2007

References

External links
Cymański Tadeusz Official Website
Tadeusz Cymański - parliamentary page - includes declarations of interest, voting record, and transcripts of speeches.
 

1955 births
Living people
People from Nowy Staw
Mayors of places in Poland
United Poland politicians
Members of the Polish Sejm 1997–2001
Members of the Polish Sejm 2001–2005
Members of the Polish Sejm 2005–2007
Members of the Polish Sejm 2007–2011
Members of the Polish Sejm 2015–2019
Members of the Polish Sejm 2019–2023
United Poland MEPs
MEPs for Poland 2009–2014
University of Gdańsk alumni